Vijitha Padmini Amerasekera (born 30 December 1961) is a Sri Lankan former athlete. She competed in the women's javelin throw at the 1992 Summer Olympics.

References

External links
 

1961 births
Living people
Athletes (track and field) at the 1992 Summer Olympics
Sri Lankan female javelin throwers
Olympic athletes of Sri Lanka
Place of birth missing (living people)